Cumbres Mayores is a town and municipality located in the province of Huelva, Spain. It holds a population of 2,022 inhabitants.

References

External links
Cumbres Mayores - Sistema de Información Multiterritorial de Andalucía

Municipalities in the Province of Huelva